The 2005 Nebelhorn Trophy took place between September 29 and October 2, 2005 at the Eislaufzentrum Oberstdorf. The compulsory dance was the Ravensburger Waltz, the same compulsory dance that was used later that season at the 2006 Winter Olympics. It is an international senior-level figure skating competition organized by the Deutsche Eislauf-Union and held annually in Oberstdorf, Germany. The competition is named after the Nebelhorn, a nearby mountain.

It was one of the first international senior competitions of the season. Skaters were entered by their respective national federations, rather than receiving individual invitations as in the Grand Prix of Figure Skating, and competed in four disciplines: men's singles, ladies' singles, pair skating, and ice dance. The Fritz-Geiger-Memorial Trophy was presented to the country with the highest placements across all disciplines, which was Germany.

Results

Men

Ladies

Pairs

Ice dance

External links
 2005 Nebelhorn Trophy

Nebelhorn Trophy
Nebelhorn Trophy, 2005
2005 in German sport